The Regions Bank Building is a historic high-rise building in Jackson, Mississippi, USA. It was designed in the Renaissance Revival architectural style, and it was completed in 1929. It is the third tallest building in Jackson. As of 2015, it is owned by the Hertz Investment Group, chaired by Judah Hertz.

References

Commercial buildings completed in 1929
Renaissance Revival architecture in Mississippi
Skyscraper office buildings in Jackson, Mississippi